Kings & Queens is the second album by English singer-songwriter Jamie T, released first in the UK on 7 September 2009. The album reached No. 2 on the UK Albums Chart.

Singles
The first single released from the album was "Sticks 'n' Stones" released on 29 June 2009. It featured three B-sides; "St. Christopher", "On The Green" and "The Dance of the Young Professionals" and reached No. 15 on the UK Singles Chart.

"Chaka Demus" was the second single to be released from the album and was out a week before the album, on 31 August. It peaked at No. 23 on the UK Singles Chart. "The Man's Machine" was the third single from the album, released on 23 November 2009. The album's fourth single a re-recorded version of "Emily's Heart" along with a cover Bruce Springsteen's "Atlantic City" as a B-side was released on 15 March. A music video for "Emily's Heart" was released in February 2010.

Track listing
"368"                                                   4:43
"Hocus Pocus"                                           3:31
"Sticks 'n' Stones"                                 4:01
"The Man's Machine"                                     4:50
"Emily's Heart"                                         4:08
"Chaka Demus"            3:35
"Spider's Web"                                          4:44
"Castro Dies"                                           2:59
"Earth, Wind & Fire"                                    3:45
"British Intelligence"                                  3:19
"Jilly Armeen"                                          3:14
"The Curious Sound" ft Ben Bones (iTunes Bonus track) 2:52

Bonus tracks (Japanese edition)
"Saint Christopher"
"On the Green"
"Spider's Web" (Live at the Electric Ballroom)
"Chaka Demus" (Toddla T Remix)

Critical reception
The album received positive reviews from critics, with Brianna Saraceno of Drowned in Sound proclaiming it "a resounding success". On review aggregater Metacritic, Kings & Queens earned a 74 out of 100 score, based on 13 professional reviews.

Release in Japan
Kings & Queens was released in Japan by Tearbridge International on 17 February 2010.

Sales and certifications

References

2009 albums
Jamie T albums
Virgin Records albums
Avex Group albums
Albums recorded at Studio 13